Samir Bouzar Essaidi (born 16 August 1999) is a French professional footballer who plays as a midfielder for Nancy II.

Career
Bouzar made his professional debut with AS Nancy in a 2–1 Ligue 2 win over US Orléans on 30 November 2018.

Personal life
Born in France, Bouzar is of Algerian descent.

References

External links
 
 

1999 births
Living people
Sportspeople from Nancy, France
French sportspeople of Algerian descent
French footballers
Footballers from Grand Est
Association football midfielders
Ligue 2 players
Championnat National 3 players
AS Nancy Lorraine players